Frank Otto Haubold (March 23, 1906 – March 1985) was an American gymnast who competed in the 1928 Summer Olympics, in the 1932 Summer Olympics, and in the 1936 Summer Olympics. Haubold and his wife, Irma, were the first married couple of compete in the same Olympics.

Early life
Frank Otto Haubold was born March 23, 1906 Union City, New Jersey.

Career
Haubold worked as a textile salesman, spending 46 years with the same company.

As a gymnast, Haubold was a member of the Swiss Turnverein in Union City. He was National Champion in the all-around in 1931-32, and won national titles on the parallel bars and the pommel horse, the latter being his best event. He was the top American in the all-around event at the 1932 Summer Olympics.

Haubold was married to Irma "Chip" Haubold, who was also from Union City. They were the first married couple of compete in the same Olympics.

Death
Haubold  died March 1985 in Ridgefield, New Jersey.

Further reading
Hofmann, Annette R. (2004). Turnen and Sport: Transatlantic Transfers. Waxmann Publishing Co.

References

1906 births
1985 deaths
American male artistic gymnasts
Gymnasts at the 1928 Summer Olympics
Gymnasts at the 1932 Summer Olympics
Gymnasts at the 1936 Summer Olympics
Olympic silver medalists for the United States in gymnastics
Olympic bronze medalists for the United States in gymnastics
Sportspeople from Union City, New Jersey
Medalists at the 1932 Summer Olympics
20th-century American people